The 1936 Colgate Red Raiders football team was an American football team that represented Colgate University as an independent during the 1936 college football season. In its eighth season under head coach Andrew Kerr, the team compiled a 6–3 record and outscored opponents by a total of 199 to 67. George Vadas was the team captain. The team played its home games on Whitnall Field in Hamilton, New York.

Schedule

References

Colgate
Colgate Raiders football seasons
Colgate Red Raiders football